The UNAF U-15 Tournament is a football (soccer) tournament held between nations who are  members of the UNAF association. The first edition started in 2017 in Morocco.

Results

Summaries

UNAF_U-15_Tournament

UNAF Schools Tournament

 A round-robin tournament determined the final standings.

Performances by countries

* hosts.
° Second tournament

See also

 UNAF U-23 Tournament
 UNAF U-20 Tournament
 UNAF U-18 Tournament
 UNAF U-17 Tournament

References

External links
 الاجتماع الفني لدورة اتحاد شمال افريقيا لمواليد 2002 وبرنامج المباريات - UNAF official website

 
UNAF competitions
Under-15 association football